Hirase Dam is a gravity dam located in Yamaguchi prefecture in Japan. The dam is used for flood control, water supply and power production. The catchment area of the dam is 336.2 km2. The dam impounds about 133  ha of land when full and can store 29500 thousand cubic meters of water. The construction of the dam was started on 1973.

References

Dams in Yamaguchi Prefecture
1973 establishments in Japan